A Tatar personal name, being strongly influenced by Russian tradition, consists of two main elements: isem (given name) and familia (family name) and also patronymic. Given names were traditional for Volga Bulgars for centuries, while family names appeared in the end of the 19th century, when they replaced patronymics. In fact, the usage of family names appeared when Russian scribers gave documents to Bulgars. Later, being adapted to Soviet tradition, Volga Bulgars started to use a patronymic as the third element, especially in informal communication.

Given first name
As in Western cultures, a person has a first name chosen by his or her parents. The first name is used before the last name (surname) in most cases and is given so into the main European languages. For usage in other cases see: Names in Russian Empire, Soviet Union and CIS countries.

For Tatars living or born in Russia, every Tatar name has a transliteration in Russian language, due to Tatarstani citizens using passports where their names are written in both official languages, Tatar and Russian. The Russian version of Tatar name could significantly differ from the original Tatar pronunciation, it also could be transliterated into different ways. Therefore, the English spelling depends on the language from which the text is translated. This situation isn't common for all non-Slavic people of Russia. Chuvashes and Keräşen Tatars, for example, use Russian (Orthodox Christian) names as official, but they also have their own renderings, that they use as informal names.

Modern Tatar names could be divided into several groups by their origin: Bulgar names, Oriental names, European names, "revolutionary" names, that appeared in the early Soviet Union, but are still popular. The usage of Slavic or Christian name is uncommon.

Examples (most popular) are shown later. Cyrillic and various Russian variants of names are shown in brackets. Translation or some comments are given later.

Bulgar names
Bulgar names are names that could be translated from the Bulgar language. Sometimes, early Arabic-origin names and other loans are also  described as Bulgar. A significant part of those names were used since pre-history. After the islamization of Volga Bulgaria, Arab names were spread among nobility, but some of them also had Bulgar names. Example is a gravestone of noble woman Altın Börtek (Golden Seed) that was found in Qaban settlement and dates back to the 12th century. Often, some people have two names. The real name was probably Islamic, but the Bulgar name was used to scare away spirits, that may plunge child into woe. Some of those Bulgar names that are still in common use could mean that this child is strong and healthy. For example, the name Mintimer could be translated as I'm iron. During the 19th century, Bulgar names were dislodged by Perso-Arab names. In the 1920s, during the repression of religion in the Soviet Union, Tatars returned to Bulgar names (some of them were just invented, such as Aygöl). In modern history, Bulgar names enjoyed the most popularity during the 1980s-1990s.

Male names
Alim (Алим) - Wise
Almas (Алмас), sometimes could be confused with Almaz, that has Arabic origin and means diamond. Almas is a Tatar for it will not take (away). The same name had the first Muslim elteber of Volga Bulgaria.
Anvar (Анвар) - Bright
Arslan/Arıslan (Арслан/Арыслан) - Lion
Ayaz (Аяз) - Clear day
Aydar (Айдар) - Turkic word for Settler
Aynur (Айнур) – Moonlight beam. -nur is an Arabic loan.
Ayrat (Айрат) – unclear. Probably from Arabic hayrat
Azat (Азат) – Free; this word is of Persian origin
Bikbay (Бикбай) - Very rich
Bikbulat (Бикбулат) - Very strong
Bulat (Булат) - Damascus steel
Damir (Дамир) - Persistent
Deniz/Denis (Дениз/Денис) - Sea
Idris (Идрис) - unclear. from Arabic diligent
İldar (Илдар; Ильдар) – Ruler (has Persian ending)
İldus (Илдус; Ильдус) – Friend of Motherland
İlgiz (Илгиз; Ильгиз) - Traveller
Ilham (Ильхам) - Has Arabic origin, translates as "inspiration"
Ilfat (Ильфат) - Friend of Motherland
Ilnаr (Илнар; Ильнар) - Flame of Motherland (has Arabic ending)
Ilnaz (Ильназ) - Tender to the Motherland (has Arabic ending)
Ilnur (Илнур; Ильнур) - Light of Motherland (has Arabic ending)
Ilsur (Ильсур) - Hero of the Motherland
İlşat (Илшат; Ильшат) – Gladness of Motherland
İrek (Ирек; Ирек, Ирик) – Free
Işbulat (Ишбулат) - Like a steel
Jameel (Джамиль) - From Arabic "handsome"
Fanir (Фанир) - Smart man
Fanis (Фанис) - Light
Farhat (Фархат) - Smart
Lenar (Ленар) - Fire, light 
Mansour (Мансур) - Victorious
Mahmud (Махмуд) - originates from Arabic
Marat (Марат) - Desired, most frequent male name 
Narat (Нарат) - Forever green tree
Niaz (Нияз) - Grace
Ramil (Рамиль) - Miraculous
Razil (Разиль) - The best
Rasim (Расим) - Artist (living painter)
Shameel (Шамиль) - From Arabic "comprehensive"
Tahir (Тахир) - From Arabic pure
Tajmas (Таймас) - Who does not go astray
Timer (Тимер; Тимур) - Iron
Tulpar (Тулпар) - Winged steed
Ural (Урал) - Joy (and the name of the Ural mountains)
Uraz (Ураз) - Happy
Yuldash (Юлдаш) - Fellow traveler
Zufar (Зуфар) - Winner

Female names
Aliya (Алия) - Gift from heaven
Alsu (Алсу) - Scarlet water
Aslanbika (Асланбика)- lioness
Aygöl (Айгөл; Айгуль) – Moon Flower (has Persian ending)
Aysılu (Айсылу) – Beauty as Moon
Çulpan (Чулпан) – Turkic for Venus.
Damira (Дамира) - Persistent
Gölçäçäk (Гөлчәчәк; Гульчачак) – Flower (göl is a Persian, çäçäk is a Turkic for flower)
Güzäl, Güzäliä (Гүзәл, Гүзәлия; Гузель, Гузалия) - Beauty 
Ilnаra (Илнара; Ильнара) - Flame of Motherland (has Arabic ending)
Ilnura (Илнура; Ильнура) - Light of Motherland (has Arabic ending)
Ilsiya (Илсия; Ильсия) - Beloved by Motherland
Ilsura (Ильсура) - Hero of the Motherland
Ilzira (Ильзира) - Pilgrimage of the people
Tañsılu (Таңсылу; Тансылу) – Beauty as Evening-red
Yuldus/Yulduz (Юлдус/Юлдуз) - Star
Zukhra (Зухра) - Beautiful from Arabic
Zulfia (Зульфия) - Curly from Persian
Zemfira (Земфира) - Rebellious

Middle Eastern names
Middle Eastern names include names of Arab and Persian origin, and also Jewish and some antique names in Arabian transcription. Those names appeared in the 10th century, but the peak of their popularity had fallen in the 19th century. Those names were often complex and mostly related to religious terms. Male names often ended with -ulla (Allah), -din (religion), -abd (slave of the God), -can /spells: -jun/ (soul): Xäliulla, Islametdin, Sabircan. Also popular were different variants of the name Mohammad: Dinmöxämmäd, Möxämmätsafa, Möxämmätcan. Female names often were chosen from Mohammad's wives' and daughters' names: Ğäyşä, Zäynäp, Fatíma. Other names mostly had complex suffixes -bibi, -bikä, -banu (lady, princess), -nisa (woman), -camal /spell jah-MUL/ (beauty): Bibiğäyşä, Ğäyşäbikä, Xabibcamal, Şamsinisa.

The main tendency was to name a child with a name that no other has in neighborhood. One family also tended to name with consonance with other members of this family. Usually relatives had same endings of their names.

Male names
 Äxmät (Әхмәт; Ахмет, Ахмед) – Tatar variant of Ahmad; both names are no longer popular among Tatars, but neighboring peoples sometimes refer them as "typically Tatar names".
 Ämir (Әмир; Амир) – Emir, Arab
 Dinar (Динар), Arab
 Färit (Фәрит; Фарид) – Farid, Arab
 Ğabdulla (Габдулла, Абдулла) – Tatar variant of Abdullah
 Ğädel (Гадел; Адель) – Arabian 'Adl, sometimes could be confused with Adelia of European origin, nevertheless this name is formal
 Ğäskär (Гаскәр; Аскар) – Arabic for soldier
 Ğizzätulla (Гыйззәтулла; Гиззатулла) – Tatar variation of the Arabic first name Izzatulah, which is translated as 'Majesty', 'Honor' and 'Might' of Allah.
 Ibragim (Ибрагим) - Abraham, Arab
 İlyas (Ильяс) – Jewish Elijah
 İskändär (Искәндәр; Искандер) – rendering of Alexander the Great
 Kamil (Камил; Камиль) – Kamil, Arab
 Kärim (Кәрим; Карим) – Karim, Arab
 Nail (Наил; Наиль) - "Successful", Arab
 Rail (Раил; Раиль), Arab
 Ramil (Рамил; Рамиль), Arab
 Räşit (Рәшит; Рашид), Arab
 Rawil (Равил; Равиль), Arab
 Rişat (Ришат), probably Arabic rendering of Richard the Lionheart
 Röstäm or Rustam (Рөстәм; Рустам, Рустем), Persian (epic) hero; strong or powerful man
 Ruşan (Рушан), Persian
 Şamil (Шамил; Шамиль), Arab
 Tahir (Таһир; Тагир), Arab
 Zöfär (Зөфәр; Зуфар), Arab

Female names
 Älfiä (Әлфия; Альфия), Arab
 Asiä (Асия), Arab
 Dinara (Динара), Arab
 Färidä (Фәридә; Фарида), Arab
 Ğäliä, Äliä (Галия, Алия), Arab
 Gölnara (Гөлнара; Гульнара, Гюльнара, Гёльнара), Persian
 Gölnaz (Гөлназ; Гульназ), Persian
 Märyäm (Мәрьям; Марьям), Jewish Maria
 Miläwşä (Миләүшә; Миляуша), Persian for violet
 Nailya (Наиля), Arab
 Zöhrä (Зөһрә; Зухра), Arab

European and revolutionary names
After 1917, during de-islamization of Tatars many names, which were uncommon for Tatar culture, became popular. A major part of them were names of famous persons, so the name Albert became popular after Albert Einstein. Sometimes names or surnames of revolutionaries were chosen as given name, such as Ernest after Ernst Thälmann or Fidel after Fidel Castro Ruz. Some of them, such as Erot, Adolf, Klara and Roald, are no longer popular, others were adopted and non-Tatar populations refer to those names as Tatar names.

Urban legend says that European names were loaded from a group of Genoese merchants, which merged with Tatars in the Middle Ages.

After the October Revolution many Russian revolutionary names appeared with the renovation of traditions. Originating from Russian abbreviations, they corresponded well to Tatar phonetics and became popular. Some of these names also coincided with already existing ones.

Those names are often given for children that were born in Tatar-Russian mixed marriage.

Male names
Albert 
Alfred (Альфред)
Artur (Артур)
Edward, Eduard (Эдвард, Эдуард)
Emil (Эмиль)
Erik (Эрик)
Ferdinand/Ferdinant (Фердинанд, Фердинант)
Marsel (Марсель), became popular after Marcel Cachin
Rafael/Rafail (Рафаэль; Рафаил)
Robert (Роберт)
Rudolf (Рудольф)
Damir (Дамир; Да здравствует мировая революция! – Long life world revolution!)
Engel (Энгель) after Friedrich Engels.
Lenar, Linar (Ленар – Ленинская Армия – Lenin's Army)
Marat (Марат) after Jean-Paul Marat, also could be confused with Morat, Tatar analogy of Murad.
Radiq (Радик(ъ); Радик) - sometimes could be written as Radiy, which corresponds to Russian for radium
Rinat, Renat (Ренат, Ринат – Революция, народ, труд. –Revolution. People. Labor), it coincided with Latin name.
Vilen (Вилен) (after Vladimir Ilyich Lenin)
Vildan (Вильдан) (Vladimir Ilyich Lenin + dan - word meaning "glory")

Female names
Adelina (Adelä; Аделина, Аделя)
Albinä (Альбина)
Alinä (Алинә; Алина)
Alisä (Алисә; Алиса)
Dana (Дана), also has Persian origin
Diana (Диана), has Latin origin
Elina (Элина)
Elvirä (Эльвира)
Elza (Эльза)
Kamilla (Камилла)
Regina (Регина)
Rezidä, Rezeda (Резидә, Резеда)
Roza (Роза), popular after Rosa Luxemburg
Yana (Яна) (originates from Jean)
Yuliä (Юлия) – Russian variant of Julia.
Leniza (Лениза Ленинские заветы – Lenin's testaments), coincided with Arab name
Renata (Рената: see Rinat)

Common non-Russian names
Some names were popular among the majority of non-Slavic population of USSR. Some of them were inspired by Russian culture, but they are not Russian traditional names. Sometimes this names were given for child, that born in intermarriage with another non-Russian nationality.

Male
Çıñğız (Чингиз) after Genghis Khan
Elbrus (Эльбрус) after mountain of Caucasus
Kazbek (Казбек) after mountain of Caucasus
Ruslan (Руслан), after Pushkin's personage of Ruslan and Lyudmila. Nevertheless, Ruslan may be a Russian rendering of Turkic name Arslan, although this has not been substantiated
Timur (Тимур) after Tamerlane and Arkady Gaidar's personage Timur.

Female
Aida (Аида; after Verdi's opera)
Indira (Индира; after Indira Gandhi)
Lälä (Ляля) – Persian Lale – tulip
Liä (Лия)
Liana (Лиана)
Zemfira (Земфира) is said to be a Romani name.

References

 

Tatar culture
Tatar language
Names by culture
Russian given names
Turkic given names